Vagner da Silva Noronha (born 5 July, 1984 in Caetés, Pernambuco) is a Brazilian long-distance runner. In 2019, he competed in the men's marathon at the 2019 World Athletics Championships held in Doha, Qatar. He finished in 51st place.

References

External links 
 

Living people
1984 births
Place of birth missing (living people)
Brazilian male long-distance runners
Brazilian male marathon runners
World Athletics Championships athletes for Brazil
20th-century Brazilian people
21st-century Brazilian people